Ian McDonald may refer to:
 Ian McDonald (civil servant) (1936−2019), Ministry of Defence spokesman during the Falklands War
 Ian McDonald (musician) (1946−2022), member of King Crimson, 1969−70, and Foreigner, 1977−79
 Iain Matthews (born 1946), previously known as Ian McDonald, member of Fairport Convention 
 Ian McDonald (cricketer) (1923−2019), Australian cricketer
 Ian McDonald (footballer, born 1951) (born 1951), Scottish football midfielder with Darlington
 Ian McDonald (footballer, born 1953), English football midfielder with York City and Aldershot, among others
 Ian McDonald (footballer, born 1958) (born 1958), Scottish football midfielder with Partick Thistle and Greenock Morton, among others
 Ian McDonald (Guyanese writer) (born 1933), Caribbean-born writer
 Ian McDonald (British author) (born 1960), British science fiction novelist
 Ian Donald Roy McDonald (1898−1920), World War I flying ace
 W. Ian McDonald (1933−2006), New Zealand neurologist, academic, and specialist in multiple sclerosis

Ian MacDonald may refer to:
 Ian MacDonald (1948−2003), pen-name for British music critic Ian MacCormick
 Ian MacDonald (footballer) (born 1953), Scottish football defender with St. Johnstone and Carlisle, among others
 Ian MacDonald (oceanographer), American Biological Oceanographer, Florida State University
 Ian MacDonald (actor) (1914−1978), American actor and producer
 Ian MacDonald (politician), former public school teacher and former Mayor of Charlottetown, Prince Edward Island, Canada
 Ian Macdonald (Australian politician) (born 1945), Australian federal politician
 Ian Macdonald (Scottish politician) (born 1934), Scottish nationalist activist
 Ian Macdonald (barrister) (1939−2019), Scottish barrister
 Ian Macdonald (New South Wales politician) (born 1949), former Australian state politician
 Ian G. Macdonald (born 1928), British mathematician
 L. Ian MacDonald (born 1947), Canadian writer, broadcaster, and diplomat
 H. Ian Macdonald (born 1929), Canadian economist, civil servant, and President of York University, 1974−1984
 Ian MacDonald (architect) (born 1953), Canadian architect
 Ian Verner Macdonald (1925–2022), Canadian writer and diplomat
 Ian MacDonald (physician) (1873−1932), Scottish physician
 Ian MacDonald (rugby union) (born 1968), South African rugby union player
 Ian Macdonald, character in the 1927 film Annie Laurie

Iain MacDonald or McDonald may refer to:

 Iain MacDonald (businessman), Irish entrepreneur
 Iain B. MacDonald, British television director
 Iain Fraoch MacDonald (died 1368), founder of Clan MacDonald of Glencoe
 Iain Sprangach MacDonald (died 1340), founder of Clan MacDonald of Ardnamurchan
 Iain McDonald (born 1952), Scottish football winger with Rangers and Dundee United
 Iain MacDonald, Scottish bagpiper, member of the MacDonald Brothers